The Try This Tour  was the second concert tour by American recording artist P!nk. The tour was launched in support of her third studio album Try This (2003) and visited Europe and Australia.

About the show
The show itself was split into four acts, each representing her three albums and an acoustic act. For the first act, to support her album Can't Take Me Home, Pink sported a massive pink Mohican, a throwback to her pink-haired R&B Can't Take Me Home days. For the second act, to support Missundaztood, she wore a long blond wig and a red leather jacket. For the acoustic act, she wore a long blue, red and white dress. For the fourth act, to support Try This, she lost the wigs and performed in a rock chick style get up. Finally, for the encore, she came dressed up in an outfit fitting for a cover of the Guns N' Roses song "Welcome to the Jungle". For the finale, she performs "Get The Party Started" up in the air.

Setlist
{{hidden
| headercss = background: #ccccff; font-size: 100%; width: 65%;
| contentcss = text-align: left; font-size: 100%; width: 75%;
| header = Main set
| content = 
"Can't Take Me Home" 
"There You Go" 
"Split Personality" 
"Most Girls" 
"Lady Marmalade" 
"I Wanna Rock" 
"Don't Let Me Get Me" 
"18 Wheeler" 
"Family Portrait" 
"Just like a Pill" 
"Respect" 
Medley: "My Vietnam" / "Misery" / "Eventually"
Medley: "Summertime" / "Me and Bobby McGee" / "Piece of My Heart" 
"Feel Good Time" 
"God Is a DJ" 
"Oh My God"
"Trouble" 
"Last to Know" 
"Try Too Hard"
"Unwind"
Encore
 "Welcome to the Jungle"
 "Get the Party Started"
}}

Tour dates

Notes:

a This concert was a part of "Frauenfeld Open Air Festival".
b This concert was a part of "Letz Rock Festival".
c This concert was a part of "Rock Werchter Festival".
d This concert was a part of "Open'er Festival".
e This concert was a part of "Gatufest".
f This concert was a part of "T in the Park".
g This concert was a part of "Oxegen".

h This concert was a part of "Golden Stag Festival".
i This concert was a part of "Lucca Festival".
j This concert was a part of "Skanderborg Festival".
k This concert was a part of "Alive Festival".
l This concert was a part of "Bonn Summer Open Air Festival".
m This concert was a part of "Open Air Gampel".
n These concerts were a part of "V Festival".

Cancellations:
July 31, 2004 - Pavilhão Atlântico, Lisbon, Portugal

Broadcast and recordings

A recording of the Try This Tour from Manchester, England was released on DVD titled Pink: Live in Europe outside Europe in early 2006. It was not released in some European regions until November 2006. The DVD contains the full show (with the exception of Christina Aguilera's "Beautiful" during "Lady Marmalade", which is censored) and features a bonus film, On the Road with Pink.

References

External links
 Official Website

Pink (singer) concert tours
2004 concert tours
Concert tours of Australia
Concert tours of Europe
Concert tours of France
Concert tours of Germany
Concert tours of Ireland
Concert tours of Oceania
Concert tours of the United Kingdom